YTD may refer to:

Abbreviation of year-to-date
Thicket Portage Airport, Canada, IATA code